The 2001 Rolex 24 at Daytona was a Grand-Am Rolex Sports Car Series 24-hour endurance sports car race held on February 3–4, 2001 at the Daytona International Speedway road course. The race served as the first round of the 2001 Rolex Sports Car Series. The race saw increased media attention due to Dale Earnhardt and Dale Earnhardt Jr. competing together for Corvette Racing. The father-son duo finished the race 4th overall. Earnhardt died several weeks later in the 2001 Daytona 500.

Victory overall and in the GTS class went to the No. 2 Chevrolet Corvette C5-R from Corvette Racing, driven by Johnny O'Connell, Ron Fellows, Chris Kneifel, and Franck Fréon. The GT class was won by the No. 31 Porsche 996 GT3-RS from White Lightning Racing, driven by Christian Menzel, Randy Pobst, Mike Fitzgerald, and Lucas Luhr. The SRP class was won by the No. 63 Kudzu DLY from Downing/Atlanta Racing, driven by Howard Katz, Chris Ronson, A. J. Smith, and Jim Downing. The SRP II class was won by the No. 21 Archangel Motorsport Services Lola B2K/40, driven by Andy Lally, Paul Macey, Martin Henderson, and Peter Seldon. Finally, the AGT class was won by the No. 11 Hamilton Safe Motorsports Chevrolet Camaro, driven by Ken Bupp, Dick Greer, Doug Mills, and Simon Gregg.

Race results
Class winners in bold.

External links

Official Results

Car Information & Images

24 Hours of Daytona
2001 in American motorsport
2001 in sports in Florida